Microgenia edwini is a species of sea snail, a marine gastropod mollusk in the family Raphitomidae.

Description
The length of the shell attains 4 mm, its diameter 1¼ mm.

(Original description) The small, solid shell is fusiformly turreted. It is reddish-brown and white spotted. The shell contains 5 whorls, the apical one white, smooth and mammillated, the second finely punctated like a thimble, third and fourth spirally and sharply carinated with two keels, a much finer one below. The body whorl is sharply keeled at the angle having eight spiral lines below, between the suture and the spiral keels very finely longitudinally striated. The aperture is small, ovate, brownish within. The columella is whitish, nearly straight. The outer lip is finely denticulated at the edge, contracted below. The posterior sinus is wide and deep.

Distribution
This marine species is endemic to Australia and occurs off New South Wales and Tasmania

References

 Laseron, C. 1954. Revision of the New South Wales Turridae (Mollusca). Australian Zoological Handbook. Sydney : Royal Zoological Society of New South Wales pp. 56, pls 1–12. 
 May, W.L. & Macpherson, J.H. 1958. An Illustrated Index of Tasmanian Shells revised by J. Hope Macpherson. Hobart : Government Printer 54 pp.
 Powell, A.W.B. 1966. The molluscan families Speightiidae and Turridae, an evaluation of the valid taxa, both Recent and fossil, with list of characteristic species. Bulletin of the Auckland Institute and Museum. Auckland, New Zealand 5: 1–184, pls 1–23

External links
  Hedley, C. 1922. A revision of the Australian Turridae. Records of the Australian Museum 13(6): 213-359, pls 42-56 
 

edwini
Gastropods described in 1894
Gastropods of Australia